The Butterfly Lovers, also known as The Assassin's Blade or Jiandie, is a 2008 Hong Kong film directed by Jingle Ma and starring Wu Chun, Charlene Choi, and Hu Ge. It is based on the Chinese legend of the Butterfly Lovers, but in a wuxia setting.

Plot
The movie begins with an explanation of the legend of the Butterfly Lovers. Zhu Yanzhi disguises herself as a man to go to Soul Ease Clan, which she must do to learn fighting skills which will help protect her family. While there she meets Bro Shan who protects her and calls her Little Bro, unaware that she is a woman. She has a love of butterflies and decorates Bro Shan's sword with two butterflies. At first Bro Shan is angry at Yanzhi for drawing butterflies on his sword but eventually accepts it. The pair develop a close friendship. Bro Shan eventually realizes that Yanzhi is a woman and makes a butterfly pin for her. Eventually, Bro Ma, Yanzhi's childhood friend comes to pick her up and take her back to her family. Yanzhi is pleased that she will be going home but says she will miss Bro Shan, who she is now in love with. Before she leaves, Bro Shan takes her to Butterfly Valley, a beautiful grassy green field where hundreds of butterflies fly.

Yanzhi is taken back to her family and is horrified when she realizes that her parents have set up an arranged marriage between her and Bro Ma. She refuses to follow through with the marriage. However, Bro Ma chains up Yanzhi in order to force her to marry him. When Bro Shan comes to visit, he promises that he will rescue her but Bro Ma is suspicious of him and creates a plan to prevent any interference. He imprisons Yanzhi's parents and tells Yanzhi that he will kill Bro Shan and her parents unless she marries him. Fearing for their lives, she promises that she will marry Ma.

When Shan comes to visit, Yanzhi tells him that she is no longer in love with him because their backgrounds are too different. She returns the butterfly pin and cuts off a lock of her hair to give to Shan (an ancient Chinese tradition, similar to returning an engagement ring). Shan, believing that Yanzhi no longer loves him, is heartbroken and leaves.

Yanzhi is also heartbroken because now she will have to marry a man she does not wish to marry. During the night, Teacher Herbal Head, a teacher from Soul Ease Clan, visits her and gives her a herb that will make her appear dead. On the day of the wedding, Yanzhi eats this. Everyone believes her to be dead, including Bro Ma, who is horrified, and exclaims "You would rather die than marry me?!". The wedding turns into a funeral.

Bro Shan is still heartbroken, but decides that he must visit Yanzhi to wish her well, believing that Yanzhi is happy, so he should be happy. On the way there, he is met by Yanzhi's serving girl, who tells him that Yanzhi has committed suicide. Bro Shan is horrified because he realizes that Yanzhi wasn't happy and had only agreed to marry Ma in order to save him. He decides that he will bury Yanzhi in Butterfly Valley, where she will be happy.
Shan comes to Yanzhi's funeral to get her body. A bloody battle occurs between Shan and Ma. Both Ma and Shan are suffering from horrible injuries by the time Ma finally surrenders. Shan takes Yanzhi's body and carries her all the way to butterfly valley. He digs a grave for her and lays her there to rest. Finally succumbing to his injuries and exhaustion he lies down in the grave, next to Yanzhi, kisses her, and dies.
Shan's friends see the two lovers, side by side, and decide to finish what Shan had started; They fill up the grave.
Yanzhi, however, is still not really dead. She cannot move or speak, but she can hear. She wakes up and sees Shan next to her, dead, and sees Shan's friends burying them together. She whispers, "Wait for me", closes her eyes, and also dies, so that she can be with Shan.
When the grave is completely filled, the two butterflies on Shan's sword flutter off the sword and fly into the air, together. In the afterlife, we see that Yanzhi and Shan are finally together.

Cast
Wu Chun as Liang Zhongshan
Charlene Choi as Zhu Yanzhi
Hu Ge as Ma Cheng'en
Ti Lung as Zhu Gongyuan
Harlem Yu as Uncle Caotou
Xian Seli as Yinxin
Li Qinqin as Zhu Yanzhi's mother
Shaun Tam as Axe gang boss
Hung Yan-yan as Uncle Toutuo
Shao Bing as General Tie
Louis Fan

References

External links
 
 
 The Butterfly Lovers at Hong Kong Cinemagic
 The Butterfly Lovers at loveHKfilm.com

2008 films
2000s Cantonese-language films
Wuxia films
2000s romance films
Films directed by Jingle Ma
Hong Kong romance films
Films set in the Eastern Jin (317–420)
Cross-dressing in film
2000s Hong Kong films